The Toronto Blizzard were a professional soccer club based in Toronto, Ontario, Canada that played in the North American Soccer League.

History
The Toronto Metros joined the NASL in 1971. Their home field was Varsity Stadium.

In 1975, 50% of the team was purchased for $250,000 by the Toronto Croatia of the National Soccer League, and the team became the Toronto Metros-Croatia. The club won the 1976 Soccer Bowl championship. However, they continued to struggle at the gate.  In mid September 1976, it was reported that team owed $100,000 to the Ontario government and $95,000 to the metropolitan Toronto government, that several star players were free agents and the team might fold.

The Global Television Network purchased 85% of the struggling Toronto Metros-Croatia on February 1, 1979 for $2.6 million. Following the purchase, Toronto Croatia returned to the NSL as a separate club. With only 7 of the 26 players from the 1978 roster staying, the NASL team was renamed the Toronto Blizzard following the takeover. Under the new ownership, attendances nearly doubled. From 1979 to 1983 the Blizzard played home games at Exhibition Stadium before returning to Varsity Stadium for the 1984 NASL season.

The Blizzard were members of the NASL until 1984, the last year of league operations. The team were runners-up for the league championship in 1983, losing the Soccer Bowl to the Tulsa Roughnecks 2–0 in front of nearly sixty thousand people at Vancouver's BC Place Stadium. They were runners-up again in 1984 when they lost to the Chicago Sting two games to none in a best of three championship series. The club was coached in these final two years by Bobby Houghton, assisted by Dave Turner and featured Roberto Bettega, David Byrne, Cliff Calvert, Pasquale De Luca, Charlie Falzon, Sven Habermann, Paul Hammond, Paul James, Conny Karlsson, Victor Kodelja, Trevor McCallum, Colin Miller, Jan Möller, Jimmy Nicholl, Ace Ntsoelengoe, Randy Ragan, Neill Roberts, John Paskin, Derek Spalding, and Bruce Wilson in its lineup.

The Blizzard qualified for the play-offs on only two other occasions, in 1979 and 1982, losing in the first round each time. Prominent players during the first four years included Clyde Best, Željko Bilecki, Jimmy Bone, Roberto Bettega, Drew Busby, David Byrne, Cliff Calvert, Tony Chursky, David Fairclough, Colin Franks, George Gibbs, Jimmy Greenhoff, Steve Harris-Byrne, Graham Hatley, Victor Kodelja, Sam Lenarduzzi, Peter Lorimer, Ivan Lukačević, Drago Vabec, Mike McLenaghen, Willie McVie, Alan Merrick, Charlie Mitchell, Juan Carlos Molina, Jan Möller, Francesco Morini, Ace Ntsoelengoe, Bobby Prentice, Randy Ragan, Neill Roberts, Malcolm Robertson, Peter Roe, Jomo Sono, Gordon Sweetzer, Blagoje Tamindžić, Jose Velasquez, and Bruce Wilson.

The Metros-Croatia fielded a team in NASL's indoor league in 1975 and 1976, as did the Blizzard from 1980 through 1982.

In 2010, the 1976 Soccer Bowl winning team was inducted into the Canada Soccer Hall of Fame.

Year-by-year team record

Metros

Metros-Croatia

Blizzard

Championships
 North American Soccer League, Soccer Bowl: 1976
 Divisions: 1973, 1977
 Conference: 1976

Ownership
 John Fisher (1971–74)
 Sam Paric (1975–78)
 Global Television Network (1979–81)
 Karsten von Werseb (1981–84)

Head coaches
 Graham Leggat (1971–72)
 Arthur Rodrigues (1972–74)
 Frank Pike (1975 indoor season only)
 Ivan Marković (1975–76)
 Marijan Bilić (1976) interim
 Domagoj Kapetanović (1976, 1978)
 Ivan Sangulin (1977)
 Keith Eddy (1979–81)
 Bob Houghton (1982–84)

Assistant coaches
 Dave Turner (1982–84)

Notable players

  Juan Carlos Molina
  Ivair Ferreira
  Clyde Best
  Nick Albanis
  Aldo D'Alfonso
  Željko Bilecki
  Brian Budd
  Tony Chursky
  Pasquale de Luca
  Charlie Falzon
  Tibor Gemeri
  Sven Habermann
  Graham Hately
  Robert Iarusci
  Paul James
  Victor Kodelja
  Sam Lenarduzzi
  Trevor McCallum
  Mike McLenaghen
  Dave McQueen
  Colin Miller
  Randy Ragan
  Peter Roe
  Gordon Sweetzer
  Gordon Wallace
  Bruce Wilson
  Renard Moxam
  Cliff Calvert
  David Fairclough
  Colin Franks
  George Gibbs
  Jimmy Greenhoff
  Steve Harris-Byrne
  Jimmy Kelly
  Alec Lindsay
  Alan Merrick
  Dave Needham
  Phil Parkes
  Brian Talbot
  Dick Howard
  Nikos Sevastopoulos
  Conleth Davey
  Dave Henderson
  Alessandro Abbondanza 
  Roberto Bettega
  Francesco Morini
  Marino Perani
  Damian Ogunsuyi
  Jimmy Nicholl
  Jose Velasquez
  Juan Carlos Ramirez Gaston
  Eusébio
  Robert Godoka
  Jimmy Bone
  Drew Busby
  Alex Cropley
  Duncan Davidson
  Peter Lorimer
  Willie McVie
  Charlie Mitchell
  Bobby Prentice
  Malcolm Robertson
  Derek Spalding
  David Byrne
  Ace Ntsoelengoe
  John Paskin 
  Neill Roberts
  Jomo Sono
  Julius Sono
  Geoff Wegerle
  Tore Cervin
  Conny Karlsson
  Jan Moller
  Gungor Tekin
  Dan Counce
  Paul Hammond
  Jimmy McAlister
  Alan Merrick
  Derek Spalding
  Arno Steffenhagen
  Sead Sušić
  Blagoje Tamindžić
  Filip Blašković
  Drago Vabec
  Ivica Grnja
  Ivan Lukačević
  Damir Šutevski
  Vojin Lazarević
  Stjepan Loparić

After the NASL
On March 28, 1985, the NASL officially suspended operations for the 1985 season, when only Toronto and Minnesota Strikers were interested in playing. In the meantime Blizzard owners York-Hanover purchased Dynamo Latino of the National Soccer League with the intention of renaming them the Toronto Blizzard. Though the Blizzard franchise had never actually folded, they had ceased operations for several months between these incarnations and NSL regulations did not permit a name change in the midst of the season. The following season (1986) Dynamo Latino began play as the Toronto Blizzard. A history of this team can be found at Toronto Blizzard (1986–93).

References

External links
 Gallery of Toronto Blizzard jerseys on NASLJerseys.com

Bibliography
Wangerin, David. Soccer in a Football World: The Story of America's Forgotten Game. WSC Book (2006).

Association football clubs established in 1971
Association football clubs disestablished in 1984
Canadian indoor soccer teams
 
Defunct soccer clubs in Canada
North American Soccer League (1968–1984) teams
Bli
North American Soccer League (1968–1984) teams based in Canada
1971 establishments in Ontario
1984 disestablishments in Ontario
Former Corus Entertainment subsidiaries